The Embassy of the Republic of Indonesia in Lisbon (Indonesian: Kedutaan Besar Republik Indonesia di Lisabon) is the diplomatic mission of the Republic of Indonesia to the Republic of Portugal. The embassy is located at Av. Dom Vasco da Gama 40, 1449-039, Belém, Lisboa, Portugal. The first Indonesian ambassador to Portugal was Harry Pryohoetomo Haryono (2001-2004)

History 
Since the Portuguese came to Malacca in 1511, Portugal had spread its colonies around the region, including Indonesia, searching for pepper and spreading the Roman Catholic religion. The Sundanese Kelapa community initially welcomed them, but later on, it turned out to be a colonialization effort

After Indonesia gained its independence, the two countries began to establish bilateral relations since 1950. The Indonesian first president, Sukarno, had the chance to visit Portugal in 1960. However, the excellent relationship started to break in 1975 due to the East Timor issue.

Twenty-four years later, on 28 December 1999, Indonesia and Portugal had rebuilt their diplomatic relations, just four months after East Timor separated from Indonesia. In May 2012 President Cavaco Silva visited Indonesia, and this was the first visit by a Portuguese president since 1950

References

External links 

 The Embassy of the Republic of Indonesia in Lisbon
 The Embassy of the Republic of Portugal in Jakarta

Diplomatic missions of Indonesia
Diplomatic missions in Lisbon